Rabi Pirzada is a Pakistani former pop singer, Songwriter, television host, artist and calligrapher.

Career
Pirzada launched her career in 2004. She released her first song "Dahdi Kurree" in 2005. Her other songs were "Mujhe Ishq Hai", "Jadoo", and "Kisi Ke Ho Ke Raho". Her song "Kisi Ke Ho Ke Raho" was composed by the renowned song lyricist Shoaib Mansoor.

She had also started content writing for news websites such as US News Box. She also hosted a weekly television show. Her TV drama production Qissa Kursi Ka was launched in July 2016. She frequently makes guest appearances on Pakistani television comedy and talk shows such as on Dunya News's show Mazaaq Raat. In 2018, Peerzada made her film debut in the film Shor Sharaba in the lead role alongside Meera.

Peerzada has several projects in making, including director Shahzad Gujjar's romantic-comedy film Court Marriage, which was announced in late 2017. She is also reported to star in a Hollywood production.

After the death of Khadim Hussain Rizvi, she tweeted that he and his followers had always supported her work of Islamic calligraphy and helping the poor.

In a 2017, she criticized Bollywood films and actor Salman Khan, blaming them for promoting crime amongst the youth.

On 4 November 2019, she left the film industry due to her leaked private pictures and videos. In 2019, she also threatened Indian Prime Minister Narendra Modi with suicide attack and attack from snakes.

Filmography

Films

Television appearances

Music albums

Painting career 
Rabi has been painting since she was eight years old. She is a self-taught artist, but learned art specifics from her friend, the painter J. Arif. She started with calligraphy and continues to do calligraphy of Quran in various forms, including calligraphing the complete scripture. Later, she started painted various objects as well as portraits. On a commercial side, she sells her paintings to support orphan children and the needy.

References

External links
 

1989 births
Living people
Pakistani pop singers
Pakistani drummers
21st-century Pakistani women singers
21st-century drummers